Oil's Well That Ends Well is a 1958 short subject directed by Jules White starring American slapstick comedy team The Three Stooges (Moe Howard, Larry Fine and Joe Besser). It is the 188th entry in the series released by Columbia Pictures starring the comedians, who released 190 shorts for the studio between 1934 and 1959.

Plot
The Stooges have lost their jobs. Adding insult to injury, they received a letter from Dad with the news that he requires surgery. To help pay for the operation, the father suggests the boys search for uranium on his mining property. The boys locate the uranium, but run afoul of a load of dynamite. Then, when they are trying to fix the water pump, it starts gushing oil. Joe tries to cork it by sitting on it, but he is sent flying into the air. When he wishes it would stop, it does, much to Moe and Larry's dismay. Joe manages to get the oil started again, and the boys are in the money.

Production notes
Though technically a reworking of Oily to Bed, Oily to Rise, none of the original plot is featured in this short. In addition, the only recycled footage utilized in Oil's Well That Ends Well is the shot of Curly Howard riding the oil gusher up into the sky. In addition, the concept of Joe wishing for things that come true was borrowed from Oily to Bed, Oily to Rise. The film was shot over two days on August 26–27, 1957. It is also one of two Stooge films that does not have a supporting cast, the other being 1950's Self-Made Maids.

Oil's Well That Ends Well contains a rare instance where the Stooges break the fourth wall, and directly address the camera audience. Joe, after being chastised by Moe and told to sit down, turns around to the camera and mouths "I hate him!" to the audience before walking off-screen.

The title Oil's Well That Ends Well is a pun of "all's well that ends well."

See also
 List of American films of 1958

References

External links 
 
 
Oil's Well That Ends Well at threestooges.net

1958 films
1958 comedy films
The Three Stooges films
American black-and-white films
The Three Stooges film remakes
Films directed by Jules White
Columbia Pictures short films
Films with screenplays by Felix Adler (screenwriter)
Works about petroleum
1950s English-language films
1950s American films